Tatamá National Natural Park (Spanish: Parque Nacional Natural Tatamá or PNN Tatamá) is a national park in the Cordillera Occidental, Colombia. Established in 1987, the park encompasses  of primary west-Andean tropical and subtropical rainforest, temperate cloud forest, and páramo habitat in an area that spans the departments of Risaralda, Chocó and Valle del Cauca, within the Chocó bioregion. 

The protected area is of high scientific interest because of its rich biodiversity and the unique state of conservation of its ecosystems. The park is home to tributaries of the San Juan and Cauca Rivers and, in its highest elevation area, to Páramo Tatamá, which along Frontino and El Duende, represents one of the only three páramos in Colombia that have not been altered by humans.

Flora and fauna 

Over 560 species of orchids can be found in the park, many of which are endemic to the area (such as the Montezuma maxillaria). The protected area is also a popular birding destination in Colombia with more than 620 bird species recorded, including 16 endemic to Colombia (of which seven are only found in the western Cordillera):
Colombian Chachalaca
Chestnut Wood-Quail
Dusky Starfrontlet
Grayish Piculet
Yellow-eared Parrot
Parker's Antbird
Chamí Antpitta
Tatama Tapaculo
Munchique Wood-Wren
Red-bellied Grackle
Crested Ant-Tanager
Black-and-Gold Tanager
Gold-ringed Tanager
Multicolored Tanager
Turquoise Dacnis
Chestnut-bellied Flowerpiercer

Access 
The park can only be accessed via Montezuma Road (Spanish: Camino de Montezuma), a dirt road that starts in the town of Pueblo Rico and winds up Cerro Montezuma to a military base at its summit, . The Montezuma Rainforest Ecolodge property, located near the entrance of the park, is the main gateway to the protected area.

References 

National parks of Colombia
Nature reserves in Colombia
Protected areas established in 1987
1987 establishments in Colombia
Northwestern Andean montane forests